Japanese elm is a common name for several plants and may refer to:

Ulmus davidiana var. japonica
Zelkova serrata, native to Japan, Korea, eastern China, and Taiwan